Wild Field ( Dikoe pole) is a 300 ha (740 ac) nature reserve near the city of Tula in Tula Oblast in the European part of Russia, approximately 250 km (150 mi) south of Moscow.  It was established in 2012 by Russian scientists Sergey Zimov and Nikita Zimov as a companion to Pleistocene Park in Siberia.

Unlike Pleistocene Park, Wild Field’s primary purpose is not scientific research but public outreach, i.e. it will provide a model of what an unregulated steppe ecosystem looked like before the advent of humans. It is situated near a federal road and a railway station and is accessible to the general public.

The reserve
Wild Field comprises 300 ha (740 ac) of which at first 150 ha were fenced off and stocked with animals.  In 2017 the fenced area was increased to 280 hectares.

The area of the reserve will be increased to 500 ha in 2018–2019. For the future, plans call for a continuous increase of the area in relation to the increasing population of animals in the reserve.

Animals
Introduced between 2012 and 2015 were
 Bashkir horses (a strain of Equus ferus caballus), from a feral herd in the southern part of the Ural Mountains, 
 Altai maral/Altai wapiti (Cervus canadensis sibiricus), 
 Edilbaevskaya sheep (a strain of Ovis orientalis aries), 
 Roe deer (Capreolus spec.), 
 Kalmykian cattle (a strain of Bos primigenius taurus), 
 Domestic yaks (Bos mutus grunniens), both polled and unpolled. 
The total number of large herbivores in Wild Field Park numbered around 150 in April 2015.

In 2016, several wild boars (Sus scrofa) and a female elk[BE]/moose[AE] (Alces alces) entered the reserve through special one-way entrances built into the fences.  Several young wild boar/domestic pig hybrids (Sus scrofa × domesticus) have also been purchased to be released into the park upon maturing.

In 2017, four reindeer (Rangifer tarandus) and 73 domestic Pridonskaya goats (a strain of Capra aegagrus hircus) were added.

A herd of 20 plains bison (Bison bison bison) which was to be delivered in March 2014 by the True Nature Foundation, a European organization for ecological restoration and rewilding, could not be imported due to a blanket import ban on cattle from countries affected by the Schmallenberg virus.

The introduction of a test group of camels (Camelus spec.) is under consideration. Further plans call for the introduction of bison, saiga antelopes, vultures, bobak marmots and speckled ground squirrels.

Notes

External links 

 Official park website for Pleistocene Park and Wild Field (Last update February 2017), see especially Photo Gallery and News
 Official facebook site for Pleistocene Park and Wild Field
 “Wild Field” Manifesto. Sergey A. Zimov, 2014.
 First Tula Telechannel (2015): На территории Воловского района создаётся экспериментальный заповедник. (On the territory of Volovsky district an experimental reserve is created.)  TV feature on the Wild Field reserve, 2:54 min., uploaded 31 March 2015. Russian. Accessed 4 December 2016.
 Eli Kintisch (2015): “Born to rewild. A father and son’s quixotic quest to bring back a lost ecosystem – and save the world.” In: Science, 4 December 2015, vol. 350, no. 6265, pp. 1148-1151. (Alternative version.) Accessed 4 December 2016.
 ZoominTV (2017) Jurassic Park IRL: How the mammoth can help our future. Video, 3:25 min., uploaded 10 July 2017. Note: This video shows Wild Field footage cut against an interview about Pleistocene Park. Accessed 6 April 2017.
 Дмитрий Грудинин: “Степная экспедиция Дикое поле.” (“Steppe expedition Wild Field.”) Video taken during the Steppe Expedition of the Russian Geographical Society to Wild Field. Youtube, uploaded on 7 June 2018. Accessed 9 June 2018.

References 

Ecological experiments
Animal reintroduction
Nature reserves in Russia
Rewilding